Royal Marines Association Football Club was a football club based in Lympstone, near Exmouth in Devon, England, the committee and players were all serving or retired Royal Marines. At the end of the 2011–12 season, the club withdrew from the South West Peninsula League Premier Division and folded, due to increased operational commitments.

Honours

League honours
South West Peninsula League Division One East
Champions (1): 2009–10

See also
Royal Marines Football Association

References

Association football clubs established in 2008
Association football clubs disestablished in 2012
Marines
Defunct football clubs in Devon
South West Peninsula League
Football Z
Defunct football clubs in England
2008 establishments in England
2012 disestablishments in England